Blood Tea and Red String is a 2006 American stop-motion-animated film, called by director Christiane Cegavske a "fairy tale for adults".  It was released on February 2, 2006 after a production time of 13 years, having been filmed in various places in the West Coast and in two studios.  The musical score was composed and performed by Mark Growden.

Plot
The tale centers on the struggle between the aristocratic White Mice and the rustic Creatures Who Dwell Under the Oak over the doll of their heart's desire. The Mice commission the Oak Dwellers to create a beautiful doll for them. When she is complete, the Creatures fall in love with her and refuse to give her up. Resorting to thievery, the Mice abscond with her in the middle of the night. Filled with fantastical creatures and dazzling scenery, the Creatures Who Dwell Under the Oak journey through the mystical land to reclaim their love. The mice descend into debauchery as they become drunk on blood tea.

Critical reception
On review aggregator website Rotten Tomatoes the film has an approval rating of 91% based on 11 critics, with an average rating of 7.80/10.

Brett D. Rogers of Frames Per Second magazine praised Blood Tea, calling it "exquisitely realized ... an antidote to modern digital precision and diluted creativity." The same review highlighted Mark Growden's score as suiting the film perfectly, "[w]rapping Blood Tea's intricate scenery and its characters' wordless dialect in a lingering, haunting layer of spectral sound." Harvard's Deirdre Barrett also reviewed the film positively.  “'Each man kills the thing he loves' seems to be message of the film," she wrote, "Mice, rats and spider compete for a doll and her exotic child with tragic consequences... The whole film had a dream or storybook feel. But it is the childhood nightmare or the fairy tales of the Brothers Grimm. Its magic serves sudden, violent death as often as love or beauty. It’s a tale with childhood’s imagery but not a tale for children.”

R. Emmet Sweeney of The Village Voice, called the film "a genuine piece of outsider art".

Dennis Harvey of Variety called the film an "enigmatic, dialogue-free fairy tale", but cautioned that "few will think [it is] suitable for children".

Release
On November 7, 2006, Blood Tea and Red String was released on DVD by Koch Vision, a division of Entertainment One.

Bibliography

See also
List of animated feature-length films
List of stop-motion films
Adult animation
List of films shot over three or more years

References

External links

2006 films
2006 animated films
2000s American animated films
2000s animated short films
2000s stop-motion animated films
American independent films
Animated films without speech
American adult animated films
2000s English-language films